Tatu Miettinen (born September 4, 1979) is a Finnish former professional ice hockey centre who played seventeen games in the SM-liiga for HPK and KalPa. He is the younger brother of Tommi Miettinen.

Miettinen began his career with KalPa, playing in their junior teams as well as in Suomi-sarja and Mestis, between 1994 and 2002. He joined HPK for the 2002–03 SM-liiga season and played seven games for the team, scoring two assists before returning to Kalpa. He returned to the SM-liiga with KalPa after their promotion in 2005, playing in ten games and again registering two assists.

Career statistics

References

External links

1979 births
Living people
Finnish ice hockey centres
Hokki players
HPK players
Iisalmen Peli-Karhut players
Jokipojat players
KalPa players
KooKoo players
Mikkelin Jukurit players
People from Kuopio
Sportspeople from North Savo